The Mighty Boosh was a stage show written and performed by Noel Fielding and Julian Barratt, also known as The Mighty Boosh. Michael Fielding, Rich Fulcher, and Dave Brown also appeared in the show. It toured from February 2006 to April 2006.

Overview
The main story, "The Ruby of Kukundu" – in which Howard Moon (Barratt) and Vince Noir (N. Fielding) travel to the Arctic and Spain respectively in search of the mystical gem that can restore the life of their shaman friend, Naboo (M. Fielding), slain by The Hitcher (N. Fielding) – draws heavily upon the "Tundra" scenario used previously in the TV pilot, both the TV and radio series, and the Edinburgh show Arctic Boosh. There was also a cameo appearance by Matt Berry, reprising his role as Dixon Bainbridge. The stage show was later shown on television on Boxing Day 2007, and in December 2008, on BBC Three.

DVD

The Mighty Boosh Live was released on DVD on 13 November 2006. Recorded at the Brixton Academy in April, the DVD features the full show, commentary, backstage footage, a Culture Show piece on the stage show, and deleted scenes.

Tour dates

External links
 

The Mighty Boosh
Comedy tours